Festuca elegans is a species of grass in the family Poaceae. This species is native to Morocco, Portugal, and Spain. Is perennial and prefers temperate biomes. Festuca elegans was first described in 1838.

References

elegans